Theodore Hantke (1 August 1875 – 22 May 1931) was an Australian cricketer. He played one first-class match for Western Australia in 1908/09.

See also
 List of Western Australia first-class cricketers

References

External links
 

1875 births
1931 deaths
Australian cricketers
Western Australia cricketers